Ramiro Herrera (born 14 February 1989) is an Argentine rugby union footballer who plays as a prop for Jaguares in Super Rugby.

Career

Herrera started out his rugby career in his native Argentina playing for Chenque Rugby Club from Comodoro Rivadavia. 

Then he played for Hindú Club in the Torneo de la URBA for four years before trying his luck abroad with French side Castres Olympique.

He was also selected for the Pampas XV squad for the 2013 Vodacom Cup also for their tour of Australia in 2014.

International career

Having played for Argentine representative sides such as the Pampas XV and the Jaguars, Herrera made his senior debut for Los Pumas against  on 7 June 2014 and made a second appearance in the second test between the sides a week later.   He didn't feature in Argentina's final game of the 2014 mid-year rugby union internationals against , however he was named in the squad for the 2014 Rugby Championship.

References

1989 births
Living people
People from Comodoro Rivadavia
Rugby union props
Hindú Club players
Castres Olympique players
Pampas XV players
Jaguares (Super Rugby) players
Argentine rugby union players
Argentina international rugby union players
Argentine expatriate rugby union players
Argentine expatriate sportspeople in France
Expatriate rugby union players in France
Stade Français players
Stade Rochelais players
Old Glory DC players